Betton Strange is a hamlet in the English county of Shropshire.

It is located in the civil parish of Berrington, a village  to the south. Further west is the large stone quarry at Sharpstone Hill.

Regional Cycle Route 32/33 runs through, on its way from Shrewsbury to Condover. The Shrewsbury to Bridgnorth railway line once ran to the east of the hamlet, but is now dismantled. The postcode is SY5.

Hall and chapel
Betton Strange Hall is a Grade II Listed building, built in the mid-19th Century, originally a country house but now divided into 20 flats.  It was owned by the Pearce family who founded Durston House School in Ealing and was used as a boarding school during the Second World War when some of the pupils of Durston House and Ripley Court School in Surrey were evacuated there.

There is a small church or chapel, dedicated to Saint Margaret, situated in woodland to the north of Betton Strange Hall, built in 1858 and also Grade II Listed. It is built of sandstone and still has gas lighting fitted. It is usually locked these days (the churchwardens are shared with that of Berrington's church) though is used irregularly. Originally part of the parish of St Chad's Church, Shrewsbury, it is today part of the Church of England's Diocese of Hereford, coming within the deanery of Condover.

Betton Grange
Betton Grange is a historic part of the hamlet, dating back to the 16th Century, centred on the Grade II Listed farmhouse. The GWR 6800 Class Betton Grange steam locomotive, currently under construction at the Llangollen Railway in Wales, is named after this ancient manor.

Betton Alkmere
Just to the west of Betton Strange is Betton Alkmere, a typical pool found in central Shropshire. At Betton Alkmere is a Grade II Listed early-19th Century farmhouse.

See also
Listed buildings in Berrington, Shropshire

References

External links

Villages in Shropshire
Shrewsbury and Atcham